The Finest Moments is a compilation album by Christian singer Sandi Patti, released in 1989 on Word Records. Although not your typical "best of" album, this collection of songs consists of some live highlights from her 1983 live album More Than Wonderful, some choice songs from the first ten years of her recording career from 1979's Sandi's Song to 1986's Morning Like This and one brand new track "Exalt The Name" recorded specifically for this collection co-written by CCM singer-songwriter Margaret Becker. The album peaked at No. 2 on the Billboard Top Christian Albums chart and was certified Gold by the RIAA in October 1993.

Track listing

All tracks produced by Greg Nelson and Sandi Patti except the following tracks:

 Co-produced by David T. Clydesdale (*)
 Produced by Greg Nelson (**)
 Produced by Neal Joseph (***)

Charts

Radio singles

Certifications and sales

References

1989 albums
Sandi Patty albums
Word Records albums